Moffet may refer to:

People:
Alicia Moffet (born 1998), Canadian singer
John Moffet (politician) (1831–1884), U.S. politician
John Moffet (swimmer) (born 1964), American Olympic swimmer
Thomas Moffet (or Muffet, 1553–1604), English naturalist and physician

Places:
 Moffet Inlet, Nunavut, Canada
 Moffet, Quebec, Canada

Other:
 Doctor Charles Henry Moffet, fictional character on the TV series Airwolf

See also
 Moffat (disambiguation)
 Moffett (disambiguation)
 Moffitt (disambiguation)